Badula crassa is a species of plant in the family Primulaceae. It is found in Mauritius and Réunion. Its natural habitat is subtropical or tropical dry forests. It is threatened by habitat loss.

References

crassa
Critically endangered plants
Flora of Mauritius
Flora of Réunion
Taxonomy articles created by Polbot